In Scotland, a baron or baroness is the head of a feudal barony, also known as a prescriptive barony. This used to be attached to a particular piece of land on which was situated the caput (Latin for "head") or essence of the barony, normally a building, such as a castle or manor house. Accordingly, the owner of the piece of land containing the caput was called a baron or baroness. According to Grant, there were around 350 identifiable local baronies in Scotland by the early fifteenth century and these could mostly be mapped against local parish boundaries. The term baron was in general use from the thirteenth century to describe what would have been known in England as a knight of the shire.

The 1896 edition of Green's Encyclopaedia of the Law of Scotland noted that "the mere territorial baron has no title of dignity appropriated to him". In the Encyclopaedia of the Laws of Scotland (1927), John Horne Stevenson stated that "a barony title did not itself confer any dignity upon the holder". The Court of the Lord Lyon issued a ruling in April 2015 that may recognise a person possessing a barony and other feudal titles (lordship/earl/marquis) on petition. The Lord Lyon King of Arms now prefers the approach of recognizing the particular feudal dignity as expressed in the Crown Charter that the petitioner presents.  These titles are recognised as the status of a minor baron or baroness, but not a peer. Scottish feudal baronies may be passed to any person, of either sex, by inheritance or conveyance.

Scotland has a distinct legal system within the United Kingdom. Historically, in the Kingdom of Scotland, the Lord Lyon King of Arms, as the Sovereign's minister in matters armorial, is at once herald and judge. The Scottish equivalent of an English baron is a Lord of Parliament.

History
A "Scottish Prescriptive Barony by Tenure" was, from 1660 until 2004, the feudal description of the only genuine degree of title of UK nobility capable of being bought and sold (along with the caput, or property), rather than passing strictly by blood inheritance.

Statutes of 1592 and the Baronetcy Warrants of King Charles I show the non-peerage Table of Precedence as: Baronets, Knights, Barons and Lairds, Esquire and Gentlemen.

A General Register of Sasines was set up by Statute in 1617, with entry in the Register giving the prescriptive right (right by normal or correct usage), after so many years, to the caput or essence of the barony. The individual who owned the said piece of land containing the caput was hence the baron or baroness. Uncertainty over armorial right was removed by the Lyon Register being set up by Statute in 1672, such that no arms were to be borne in Scotland unless validly entered in Lyon Register.

Up until 1874, each new baron was confirmed in his barony by the Crown by Charter of Confirmation. Up until 28 November 2004, a barony was an estate of land held directly of the Crown, or the Prince and Great Steward of Scotland. It was an essential element of a barony title that there existed a Crown Charter erecting the land into a barony, recorded in the Register of the Great Seal of Scotland. Often the original Charter was later lost, however an Official Extract has the same legal status as the original Charter.

From the Treaty of Union of 1707 - until 1999 - a unified Parliament of Great Britain (since January, 1801, known as the Parliament of the United Kingdom), at Westminster, was responsible for passing legislation affecting private law both north and south of the Scottish border. In 1999, the devolved Scottish Parliament was established, and private law measures can now be passed at Holyrood, the seat of the Scottish Parliament in Edinburgh.

Using a "prescriptive feudal grant" allowed developers to impose perpetual conditions affecting the land. The courts became willing to accept the validity of such obligations, which became known as "real burdens". In practical and commercial terms, these real burdens were like English leasehold tenure.

Abolition of feudal tenure
The first Scottish Executive was committed to abolishing the feudal system. On 28 November 2004, the Abolition of Feudal Tenure etc. (Scotland) Act 2000 came into full force and effect, putting an end to Scotland's feudal system. Under Scots law, a Scottish Prescriptive Barony by Tenure is now "incorporeal feudal heritage", not attached to the land and remains the only genuine, prescriptive, degree of title of UK nobility capable of being bought and sold – since under Section 63(1) of the Act, the dignity of baron is preserved after the abolition of the feudal system. However, the Abolition Act did end the ability to get feudal land privileges by inheriting or acquiring the caput (land or castle) in Scotland.  In common law jurisdictions, land may still be owned and inherited through a barony if the land is titled in "the Baron of X" as baron rather than in the individual's name.  In America, it passes with the barony as a fee simple appurtenance to an otherwise incorporeal hereditament, the barony being treated like a landowning corporation. In Scotland, the practice has not been tested in a Court of Session case since the Act.

What is possibly the oldest barony in Scotland, the Barony of the Bachuil, has not depended on land ownership for centuries; the barony passes along with the possession of a certain ancient stick, "The Bachuil Mór", which was once the bishop's staff of Saint Moluag in the year 562.  Unlike all other barons in Scotland, the lawful possessor of the stick is the Baron of the Bachuil, regardless of landholdings.

. Prior to the Act coming into effect, Scottish feudal baronies (including lordships and earldoms) were the only genuine title of UK nobility capable of being transferred following the sale of land containing a caput (or the sale of a feudal superiority).

Most baronies were created (erected) prior to 1745, but one was erected as late as 1824. Since the Abolition of Feudal Tenure etc. (Scotland) Act 2000 came into effect, the Lord Lyon, who is the Chief Herald of Scotland, has restored a more traditional form to the coat of arms of a baron. Barons are now identified by the helm befitting their degree. A new policy statement has been made by the Lord Lyon to this effect.

The holder of the dignity of a barony may petition the Lord Lyon for a grant of arms, as he falls under the jurisdiction of the Lyon's Court. A policy statement has been made to this effect by the Lord Lyon. The Lyon Court has no jurisdiction in relation to the assignation, or legal transfer of, feudal titles.

Usage
An English barony is a peerage (yet the abolition act of 1660 allows for some remaining non-peer baronies not converted by writ to remain as feudal baronies of free socage "incorporeal hereditament"(Article X of that Act)), but whether Scottish barons rightfully rank as peers is disputable. They are known as minor barons currently treated as noble titles of less than peerage rank.  The Scottish equivalent of an English baron is "Lord of Parliament".

The feudal baronial title tends to be used when a landed family is not in possession of any United Kingdom peerage title of higher rank, subsequently granted, or has been created a knight of the realm.  The name recorded by the Lord Lyon as part of any grant of arms or matriculation becomes the holder's name for all official purposes.

The holder of a Scottish barony (e.g., "Inverglen") may add the title to their existing name (e.g., "John Smith, Baron of Inverglen" or "Jane Smith, Baroness of Inverglen") or add the territorial designation to their surname if still in possession of the caput ("John Smith of Inverglen, Baron of Inverglen" or "Jane Smith of Inverglen, Baroness of Inverglen"); some of the oldest Scottish families prefer to be styled by the territorial designation alone ("Smith of Inverglen"). Formal and in writing, they are styled as The Much Honoured Baron/Baroness of Inverglen. A baron/baroness may be addressed socially as "Inverglen" or "Baron/Baroness" and introduced in the third person as "John Smith of Inverglen, Baron of Inverglen" or "The Baron of Inverglen" or "Jane Smith, Baroness of Inverglen" or "The Baroness of Inverglen". When referred to informally in the third person it is incorrect to refer to them as "Baron/Baroness Inverglen" or "Lord/Lady Inverglen", as these would imply a peerage title (i.e. Lord of Parliament) 

In a heterosexual married couple, if the husband is the holder of the Barony, the wife receives a courtesy title. Therefore, they may be styled "The Baron and Baroness of Inverglen", "Inverglen and Madam Smith of Inverglen", "Inverglen and Lady of Inverglen", or "The Baron of Inverglen and Lady of Inverglen." The oldest son of a feudal baron/baroness may be known by the territorial designation with the addition of "yr" (abbreviation for "younger"), e.g. "John Smith of Inverglen, yr". The eldest daughter is may be known as "Maid of [Barony]" at the end of her name, e.g. "Sandra Smith, Maid of Inverglen". 

The husband of a Baroness is not afforded a courtesy title.

The United Kingdom policy of using titles on passports requires that the applicant provides evidence that the Lord Lyon has recognised a feudal barony, or the title is included in Burke's Peerage. If accepted (and if the applicant wishes to include the title), the correct form is for the applicant to include the territorial designation as part of their surname (Surname of territorial designation e.g. Smith of Inverglen). The Observation would then show the holder's full name, followed by their feudal title e.g. The holder is John Smith, Baron of Inverglen.

The possession of the courtesy title "The Laird of ..." does not entitle the holder to style himself/herself "The Much Honoured".

Scottish heraldry

The former Lord Lyon declined to award the following baronial additaments to the arms of those feudal barons registering arms now that the Abolition of Feudal Tenure etc. (Scotland) Act 2000 is in force.  However, the current Lord Lyon has confirmed in a recent policy statement that he will officially recognise feudal barons or those possessing the dignity of baron who meet certain conditions and will grant them arms with a helmet befitting their degree. Scottish Barons rank below Lords of Parliament; while noble, they are not conventionally considered peerage titles.

In showing that Scottish barons are titles of nobility, reference may be made, amongst others, to Lyon Court in the Petition of Maclean of Ardgour for a Birthbrieve by Interlocutor dated 26 February 1943 which "Finds and Declares that the Minor Barons of Scotland are, and have both in this Nobiliary Court, and in the Court of Session, been recognised as 'titled' nobility, and that the estait of the Baronage (The Barones Minores) is of the ancient Feudal Nobility of Scotland".

Sir Thomas Innes of Learney in his 'Scots Heraldry' (2nd Ed., p. 88, note 1) states that 'The Act 1672, cap 47, specially qualifies the degrees thus: Nobles (i.e. peers, the term being here used in a restricted seventeenth-century English sense), Barons (i.e. Lairds of baronial fiefs and their "heirs", who, even if fiefless, are equivalent to heads of Continental baronial houses) and Gentlemen (apparently all other armigers).' Baronets and knights are evidently classed as 'Gentlemen' here and are of a lower degree than Barons. The Scottish Head of Baronial Houses, includes all the various styles and titles which designate the territorial nobility i.e. baron of X.

Barons may also wear two eagle feathers when in traditional dress. If the baron is a member of a clan, it is advisable to consult the clan chief on clan customs and traditions. The Lord Lyon only gives guidance and not governance on the wearing of feathers and recommends consulting with a clan chief.

Chapeau

Previously, between the 1930s and 2004, when new arms were granted or a matriculation of existing arms took note of a barony, the owner was given a chapeau or cap of maintenance as part of his armorial achievement on petitioning for the same. This chapeau is described as "gules doubled ermine" for barons in possession of the caput of the barony. An azure chapeau is appropriate for the heirs of ancient baronial families who are no longer owners of the estates. This chapeau was a relatively recent armorial invention of the late Lord Lyon Thomas Innes of Learney.  Accordingly, a number of ancient arms of feudal barons do not display the chapeau, and now it is no longer granted.

At the Treaty of Perth in 1266, Norway relinquished its claim to the Hebrides and Man, and they became part of Scotland. In 1292, Argyll was created a shire and "The Barons of all Argyll and the Foreigners' Isles", which had preceded the kingdom of Scotland, became eligible to attend the "Scots" Parliament – appearing in the record of the parliament at St. Andrews in 1309. Historically they have a chapeau, "gules doubled ermines", ermines being white tails on black.

There is a unique exception: the Barony of the Bachuil is not of feudal origin like other baronies but is allodial in that it predates (562 A.D.) Scotland itself and the feudal system, dating from the Gaelic Kingdom of Dál Riata. In recognition as allodial Barons par la grâce de Dieu not barons by a feudal crown grant, the Baron of the Bachuil has the only chapeau allowed to have a vair (squirrel fur) lining.

A chapeau, if part of an armorial achievement, is placed into the space directly above the shield and below the helmet. It may otherwise be used on a visiting card, the flap of an envelope, or to ensign the circlet of a crest badge as used on a bonnet.

Feudo-baronial mantle

Particularly Scottish in character is the feudo-baronial mantle or robe of estate - described as gules doubled silk argent, fur-edged of miniver and collared in ermine, fastened on the right shoulder by five spherical buttons Or. This may be displayed in a pavilioned form, draped behind the complete achievement of arms - or the armorial shield alone - tied open with cords and tassels, and surmounted by the chapeau. Again, Lord Lyon is no longer granting these heraldic mantles.

Helmet
The helmet is now the chief mode of recognition of a Scottish baron.  The Lord Lyon has adopted a steel helm with grille of three grilles, garnished in gold, as the current baronial additament.  Alternatively, a feudal steel tilting helm garnished in gold, that may be shown affronté, may appear, or a helmet of some other degree if the baron holds a higher rank, such as a lordship of parliament.

Supporters
Supporters, are now usually reserved for the holders of the older baronies (chartered before 1587) and those that have been in continuous family ownership. In England, supporters are reserved for the peerage, and a Scottish baron who approaches the English College of Arms is not allowed supporters. A compartment has occasionally been granted to barons, representing their territories, even in cases where there are no supporters.

Badge
A badge – distinct from the crest – as a separate armorial device, is not necessarily a feature of the arms. The badge may be used by the "tail" or following of a landowner baron. The grant is linked to the baron's standard, a heraldic flag, in the livery colours that carries a large representation of the badge. The standard is blazoned in the grant or matriculation. The livery colours are usually the two most prominent colours of the arms themselves.

Flags
A Standard – an elongated shape, tapering from 1.2 m down to 60 cm, with the fly edge split and rounded (lanceolate). The length is according to rank, from 7.5 m for the Sovereign down to 3.5 m for a Knight, Baron or Chief. It bears the Arms as on the shield or the saltire in the hoist, with the tail parted per fess with the Crest, Badge and/or Supporter, plus the motto on one or more Ribands. The Standard is set before the Baron/Chief's tent (as it's a "Headquarters" flag and does not indicate that the Armiger is in residence) rather than carried like the banner. A Standard requires a separate grant by the Lord Lyon and is only made under certain conditions.

A Guidon – one-third shorter than a Standard and tapering to a round, unsplit end at the fly. These are assigned by Lord Lyon to individuals who have Supporters to their Arms, and to others who have a following – those in a position of leadership or some official position.

A Pennon – a smaller, elongated flag 4 ft long with a pointed, rounded or swallow-tailed end, designed to be displayed on a lance, assigned by Lord Lyon to an Armiger who applies for one. It is charged with the motto of the armiger as well as the arms as on the shield.

A Banner – a square or rectangular upright representation of the Arms designed for carrying in warfare or tournaments, but now flown as a "house flag" when the Armiger is in residence and is NOT the flag of the Clan or Family.  Originally, conspicuous gallantry in battle was marked by cutting off the tail of the Standard or Pennon, turning it into a Banner. Strictly speaking, the sizes and shapes are:
 
Square banner – Sovereign, 1.5 m square; Dukes; 1.25 m sq; Earls, 1.1 m sq; Viscounts and Barons, 1 m sq; Baronets and feudal barons, 0.9 m sq; other Armigers, 70 cm wide x 85 cm high
 
Rectangular banner – typically in the ratio 3:2, or 5:4 when flown as the "house flag" of an Armiger.
 
Carrying flag – this should be sized as follows (width x height): Peers, 1.2 m x 1.5 m; Feudal Barons, 90 cm x 115 cm; Chiefs, 85 cm x 110 cm; Chieftains, 80 cm x 90 cm.

A Ensign may be occasionally granted and blazoned. This is a square flag, smaller than the flying banner, and carrying the full embroidered achievement (arms, crest, motto), again fringed in livery colours.

A Pipe banner – rather similar to a Banner, but of a size to fit on the longest drone of the pipes (usually 45 cm) and richly decorated with gold fringing, tassles and the like. The pipe banner for a Chief who is also a Peer or a Feudal Baron should have a rounded end extending beyond the length, and any other Chief a split rounded end. A feudal baron is authorised two pipers.

List of feudal baronies (created before 1707)
Below is a list of some Scottish feudal baronies created before 1707; this list does not include Scottish feudal baronies created between that year and 1838 (BGH), when the most recent creation of a Scottish feudal barony occurred. It is generally accepted that there were around 350 baronies in Scotland before 1707.

When updating this list, please create for each new entry a separate, wikified article titled "Scottish feudal barony of X", which records a brief biography of the previous incumbent and is wikilinked to this list.  Please do not simply delete the name of the previous incumbent.  Individual articles should be produced for the history of each barony, except that where few or no verifiable and detailed sources exist, histories should start with the current or previous holder and may take the form of sections within existing articles on the caput's village, town, or castle.

See also
 Commissioner (Scottish Parliament)
 Laird
 List of extant baronetcies
 Feu
 Feudal earldom
 Scottish feudal lordship
 Lord of Parliament
 English feudal barony
 Irish feudal barony
 List of Marcher lordships (Welsh Marches)

External links
 Lord Lyon's Armorial Ruling
 Law Reform Commission of Ireland 
 
 Report on Abolition of the Feudal System
The Register of Feudal Lords and Barons of The United Kingdom of Great Britain and Northern Ireland
 The Heraldry Society of Scotland 
 The Court of the Lord Lyon 
 College of Arms 
 Registry of Scots Nobility – Baronage 
 The Scottish Baronage Registry 
 Burke's Peerage

References

Further reading

Dickinson, Professor William Croft, The Court Book of the Barony of Carnwath 1523-1542, Introduction, published by Scottish History Society, 1937. "The standard scholarly work on the history of Scottish feudal baronies". In the opinion of the Lyon King of Arms
Grant, Alexander, The Development of the Scottish Peerage, published in the Scottish Historical Review, 1978.

Noble titles
Barony
Barony
Barony
Barony
 
Lists of British nobility
Lists of nobility
Nobility of the United Kingdom
Scotland
Barony
Scotland